Mohammed Ahmed Said Haidel is a citizen of Yemen, who was held in extrajudicial detention in the United States Guantanamo Bay detention camps, in Cuba. His Guantanamo Internment Serial Number is 498.
Joint Task Force Guantanamo counter-terrorism analysts estimate that he was born in 1978, in Ta'iz, Yemen.

He was transferred to Oman with nine other men, on January 16, 2017.

Inconsistent identification
Haidel was identified inconsistently on official Department of Defense documents:
 He was identified as Mohammed Ahmed Said Haidel on the Summary of Evidence memo prepared for his Combatant Status Review Tribunal, on October 8, 2004.
 He was identified as Mohammed Mohammed Ahmen Said on the Summary of Evidence memos prepared for his first and second annual Administrative Review Board hearings, on September 28, 2005, and June 7, 2006.

Press reports
On July 12, 2006, the magazine Mother Jones provided excerpts from the transcripts of a selection of the Guantanamo detainees. Haidel was one of the detainees profiled. According to the article, his transcript contained the following comment:

Official status reviews

Originally, the Bush Presidency asserted that captives apprehended in the "war on terror" were not covered by the Geneva Conventions, and could be held indefinitely, without charge, and without an open and transparent review of the justifications for their detention.
In 2004, the United States Supreme Court ruled, in Rasul v. Bush, that Guantanamo captives were entitled to being informed of the allegations justifying their detention, and were entitled to try to refute them.

Office for the Administrative Review of Detained Enemy Combatants

Following the Supreme Court's ruling the Department of Defense set up the Office for the Administrative Review of Detained Enemy Combatants.

Scholars at the Brookings Institution, led by Benjamin Wittes, listed the captives still held in Guantanamo in December 2008, according to whether their detention was justified by certain common allegations:

 Mohammed Ahmed Said Haidel was listed as one of the captives who(m):
"The military alleges ... are associated with both Al Qaeda and the Taliban."
"The military alleges ... traveled to Afghanistan for jihad."
"The military alleges that the following detainees stayed in Al Qaeda, Taliban or other guest- or safehouses."
"The military alleges ... took military or terrorist training in Afghanistan."
"The military alleges ... fought for the Taliban."
"The military alleges ... were at Tora Bora."
was a foreign fighter.
 Mohammed Ahmed Said Haidel was listed as one of the "82 detainees made no statement to CSRT or ARB tribunals or made statements that do not bear materially on the military's allegations against them."

A Summary of Evidence memo was prepared for Mohammed Ahmed Said Haidel's Combatant Status Review Tribunal, on October 8, 2004.

Haidel chose to participate in his Combatant Status Review Tribunal. On March 3, 2006, in response to a court order from Jed Rakoff the Department of Defense published a three-page summarized transcript from his Combatant Status Review Tribunal.

References

Detainees of the Guantanamo Bay detention camp
Yemeni extrajudicial prisoners of the United States
Living people
Year of birth uncertain
1978 births
People from Taiz
Bagram Theater Internment Facility detainees